Apocheiridium is a genus of pseudoscorpions belonging to the family Cheiridiidae.

The species of this genus are found in Europe and Australia.

Species:
 Apocheiridium asperum Beier, 1964 
 Apocheiridium bulbifemorum Benedict, 1978

References

Pseudoscorpions
Pseudoscorpion genera